Leola Mae Brody [Hay] (May 30, 1922 – December 14, 1997) was an All-American Girls Professional Baseball League player. Brody batted and threw right handed. She was nicknamed Bubbles.

Born in Chicago, Illinois, Brody joined the league in its inaugural season of 1943. Brody was assigned to the Racine Belles, even though she did not appear in a game for the team. After that, she played fastpitch softball for the Bloomer Girls club based in Chicago.

Following her playing retirement, Brody taught bowling and bowled in men's leagues. Throughout the 1970s, she also worked as a physical therapist at a hospital in Wetumpka, Alabama.

The AAGPBL folded in 1954, but there is a permanent display at the Baseball Hall of Fame and Museum at Cooperstown, New York since November 5, 1988, that honors the entire league rather than any individual figure.

Bubbles Brody died in 1997 in Long Grove, Illinois, at the age of 75.

Sources

1922 births
1997 deaths
All-American Girls Professional Baseball League players
Racine Belles (1943–1950) players
Baseball players from Chicago
20th-century American women
20th-century American people